The Impatient Alchemist is a 2002 Spanish–Argentine film directed by  which adapts the novel  by Lorenzo Silva. It stars Ingrid Rubio, Roberto Enríquez and Chete Lera, also featuring Adriana Ozores and Miguel Ángel Solá.

Cast

Release 
It was theatrically released in Spain on 15 May 2002.

See also 
 List of Spanish films of 2002

References 
Citations

Bibliography

External links

El Alquimista impaciente at the Metropoliglobal.com

2002 films
Spanish thriller drama films
Argentine thriller drama films
2000s Spanish-language films
2000s mystery films
Police detective films
2000s crime thriller films
Films based on Spanish novels
Films scored by Javier Navarrete
2000s Argentine films
2000s Spanish films